José Moura Gonçalves (January 5, 1914– October 18,1996), Brazilian physician, biomedical scientist, biochemist and educator, one of the pioneers of biochemistry in the country.

Moura Gonçalves studied medicine in Belo Horizonte. While a student, he began to work as an assistant in the laboratory of physiological chemistry of Professor José Baeta Vianna (May 30, 1894-October 01,1967). After graduation, he accepted an invitation to work on the chemistry of proteins and enzymes at the Instituto de Biofísica da Universidade Federal do Rio de Janeiro, under noted scientist Carlos Chagas Filho. His post-doctoral work was carried out at University of Wisconsin–Madison, in the United States, where he produced what was his most important work, the isolation of a new toxic protein from the venom of rattlesnakes, which he named crotamine.

Returning to Brazil in the first years of the 1950s, he was invited by Dr. Zeferino Vaz to join the new and ambitious project of a research medical school at the hinterland city of Ribeirão Preto, the Faculdade de Medicina de Ribeirão Preto of the Universidade de São Paulo, where he became the chairman of the department of biochemistry, and, after Vaz's departure, the new dean of the medical school, in 1964.

References

External links
 Interview with José Moura Gonçalves, Canal Ciência, IBICT (in Portuguese)
 Leite, FV: O Professor Moura Gonçalves. Revista USP Ribeirão Preto, 2002.
 Nóbrega, FG: José Moura Gonçalves. Revista ADUSP, 1998.

Brazilian biochemists
1914 births
1995 deaths
Recipients of the National Order of Scientific Merit (Brazil)
Members of the Brazilian Academy of Sciences
Academic staff of the University of São Paulo
People associated with Federal University of Rio de Janeiro